Oligoterorhynchus is a genus of parasitic worms belonging to the family Plagiorhynchidae.

Species:

Oligoterorhynchus campylurus

References

Plagiorhynchidae
Acanthocephala genera